Wings apart-like protein homolog (WAPL) is a protein that in humans is encoded by the WAPAL gene. WAPL is a key regulator of the Cohesin complex which mediates sister chromatid cohesion, homologous recombination and DNA looping. Cohesin is formed of SMC3, SMC1, RAD21 and either SA1 or SA2.   Cohesin has a ring-like arrangement and it is thought that it associates with the chromosome by entrapping it whether as a loop of DNA, a single strand or a pair of sister chromosomes. WAPL forms a complex with PDS5A or PDS5B and releases cohesin from DNA by opening the interface between SMC3 and RAD21.

Interphase 

Cohesin loading begins in telophase and is mediated by NIPBL and its binding partner MAU2. In G1, WAPL forms a complex with PDS5 and removes cohesin from the DNA but it is reloaded by NIPBL-MAU2. The equilibrium between loading and release give cohesin a DNA residence time of 20 minutes. During DNA replication, a fraction of cohesin is acetylated and binds to Sororin making it resistant to WAPL and able to hold sister chromatids together. This is crucial for the maintenance of sister chromatid cohesion because onse the sister chromatids are separated, cohesion cannot be reestablished.

Prophase pathway 
When a cell enters mitosis, Sororin is phosphorylated causing it to dissociate from cohesin meaning WAPL can remove cohesin from the DNA. A complex of SGOL1 and PP2A dephosphorylates cohesin at the centromere protecting it from WAPL-mediated release. Sister chromatid cohesion is therefore maintained at the centromeres where it is required for mitosis but lost on the arms. This removal of cohesin is known as the Prophase Pathway and results in the X-shape sister chromatids observed in chromosome spreads.

Mechanism 
WAPL releases cohesin from DNA by opening the SMC3-RAD21 interface thereby allowing DNA to pass out of the ring. Opening of this interface is regulated by ATP-binding by the SMC subunits. This causes the ATPase head domains to dimerise and deforms the coiled coil of SMC3 therefore disrupting the binding of RAD21 to the coiled coil. It is not known how WAPL regulates the process of ATP binding.

References